Demolition Man (Dennis Dunphy), also known as D-Man, is a fictional superhero appearing in American comic books published by Marvel Comics.

Publication history

Dennis Dunphy first appeared in The Thing #28 (October 1985) and was created by Mike Carlin and Ron Wilson. He first appeared as Demolition-Man in Captain America #328 (April 1987).

Fictional character biography
Dennis Dunphy was born in Lincoln, Nebraska. Dennis becomes an aspiring athlete who receives the strength augmentation treatments offered by Power Broker, Inc. Finding himself too strong now for normal sports, he becomes a professional wrestler and member of the Unlimited Class Wrestling Federation (UCWF) along with other superheroes and supervillains such as the Beyonder, the Thing, and Screaming Mimi. He refuses to throw a fight with the Thing, and is defeated. The Puppet Master later mentally compels him to attack the Thing. Dunphy refuses the Power Broker's order to help kill Ms. Marvel. He reveals his addiction to the Power Broker's drug to the Thing, and goes through a painful withdrawal when the Power Broker cuts off his drug supply.

After the fall of the UCWF, Dunphy becomes the Demolition Man and teams up with Captain America to investigate Power Broker, Inc. His costume is intentionally designed so the body of it is a duplicate of Daredevil's first costume, and the hood is a knock-off of Wolverine's. He successfully rescues Captain America from Karl Malus and helps Captain America catch him. Dunphy is captured by the Power Broker and is subjected to further treatments which augment his strength further but damage his heart. While under the influence of the stimulant, he goes mad and attacks Captain America. Dunphy suffers a heart attack, his second augmentation is reversed and he is hospitalized. Dunphy then takes a step back from superhero activity to take over Captain America's hotline.

Soon after this, Steve Rogers is stripped of his Captain America costume by the Commission on Superhuman Activities (CSA) and goes missing. Demolition Man joins Falcon, Nomad, and Vagabond to search for Rogers. They discover Rogers, who had renamed himself simply "The Captain", and they all become a short-lived informal team. They defeat the Serpent Squad in their first outing. D-Man aids the Captain, Falcon, and Nomad against Famine. D-Man is nearly killed in battle by Titania. He begins teaching Vagabond hand-to-hand combat, but is attacked by a jealous Nomad. He fights Anaconda and Slither of the Serpent Society. He is attacked and poisoned by Viper, and mistakenly fights Battle Star. Dunphy is arrested by the CSA and held for questioning about The Captain's activities.

When Dennis is finally released by the CSA, he seeks out the Captain, discovering that not only had his team disbanded, but that the East Coast Avengers team had also just disbanded and that the Captain is seeking new members. The Captain asks Demolition Man to join the Avengers and they immediately leave on a mission at the request of Battlestar. Battlestar's partner is John Walker, Captain America's replacement, who was captured by Flag-Smasher and his group ULTIMATUM. While Battlestar and the Captain investigated ULTIMATUM's Arctic base, Demolition Man is left with their plane. During the fight, the Captain discovers that Flag-Smasher's base contains a doomsday weapon (an electromagnetic pulse generator), and he orders Dunphy to set the plane on course to crash into the base and then bail out. Dennis sets the course, but then sees an enemy agent land on the plane. Dunphy elects to stay on the plane to ensure that it crashes. The plane explodes, apparently with Dunphy in it, and Captain America is unable to find any trace of him.

In a later adventure with Jack Frost, Captain America sees what he believes to be Dunphy's body frozen in suspended animation in ice near the North Magnetic Pole in the Arctic. However, he is unable to free him. Demolition Man survived the explosion, but suffered wounds that rendered him mute and in a stupor, and is discovered living among the Inuit. During a backup story to "Operation: Galactic Storm", he is rescued by U.S. Agent and the Falcon and recovers under Avengers' care. In time he becomes a hero of a subterranean group of homeless people called the Zero People. Dennis assists the Avengers who are under attack by Morgan LeFay's forces.

It was later established that Dunphy had become delusional and mentally unstable. His intentions remain pure, but he had begun to believe that a "Cosmic Gamemaster" had asked him to retrieve the seven Infinity Gems, which D-Man carried out by stealing common jewelry. At Ben Urich's request, D-Man's hero Daredevil descends into the sewers and persuades Dennis to get some help.

In Civil War: War Crimes, an unnamed newspaper carries the headline "D-Parted: D-Man On The Run After Whereabouts Revealed By Anonymous Tip".

Dennis was being considered as a "potential recruit" for the Initiative program, according to Civil War: Battle Damage Report.

During the Dark Reign storyline, D-Man is shown to be serving in the U.S. military in his civilian identity and covertly in his Demolition Man costume. For a while, he inspires several of his fellow soldiers to operate covertly in costumes as well, but he puts a stop to it out of concern for their military careers. He continues operating by himself. How he recovered from the brain damage/mental instability he had been suffering from is unknown at this point.

In a one-page strip in I am an Avenger #2, D-man attends a picnic at Avengers Mansion and competes in a pie-eating contest, besting The Thing, Protector, and Valkyrie.

D-Man made an appearance in The New Avengers #7, while various heroes are being interviewed to be a nanny for Luke Cage and Jessica Jones. He appears to be spontaneously weeping and his only lines are "I am so lonely...", "I think I came off desperate before--" and "Does Captain America ever talk about me?". When Jessica Jones says her mind is made up on a nanny (Squirrel Girl), Cage quips "D-Man it is." to which she responds "Cute".

Wonder Man recruits Demolition Man to join his Revengers. All three Avengers team defeat Demolition Man and the rest of the Revengers and they are remanded to the Raft. Demolition Man claims the Grandmaster called him to reclaim the Infinity Gems from the Avengers and that the Avengers haven't been returning his calls leading him to be recruited into the Revengers.

A brainwashed Henry Peter Gyrich chooses him to become the new Scourge of the Underworld. Captain America tracks down the new Scourge and the two engage in an intense fight. During the altercation, Captain America recognizes his strength and voice and pleads with him to stop fighting. Demolition Man accuses Captain America of making deals with villains and providing them with new lives instead of punishment, and he takes control of the brawl and Captain America's shield. As Demolition Man is about to strike the killing blow, Sharon Carter arrives on the scene and fatally shoots him.

Someone in Demolition Man's costume is seen as one of the heroes being mentored by Roderick Kingsley during AXIS. It is unclear if this is Dennis or someone else.

During the Secret Wars storyline, Dennis is accidentally resurrected by a young sorcerer who mistakes the name "D-Man" for "demon". After visiting the Avengers Mansion and meeting with Edwin Jarvis and Rage, he has the best day of his life, just before being killed by the incursion between Earth-616 and Earth-1610.

After the eight month ellipsis following Secret Wars, Demolition Man is seen as one of the partners of Sam Wilson (now the new Captain America). It is not explained how he recovered from his seemingly fatal injuries, but Sam simply remarks "He's a survivor". As part of the All-New, All-Different Marvel event, Dennis started working for Captain America as a pilot, mechanic, technician, and field backup. Dennis also bought himself battle armor to "finally look cool". He later returns to the UCWF for a special charity match against Battlestar, and the two men end up foiling an attempt to steal the money raised by the event. It is also revealed that he has a boyfriend.

Lockjaw, the Inhuman's teleporting dog, recruits D-Man in an attempt to rescue Lockjaw's siblings. D-Man travels with Lockjaw across his home Earth and beyond. Eventually all the canine siblings gain a place of safety. One with the woman he loves, D-Man's elderly neighbor.

D-Man is later seen as a security officer at the rebuilt Ravencroft Institute for the Criminally Insane.

Powers and abilities
Augmentation of Dennis Dunphy's physical attributes by Dr. Karl Malus on behalf of the Power Broker increased his physical strength, stamina and durability to superhuman levels. Dunphy possesses superhuman strength sufficient to enable him to lift at least 15 tons. He was addicted to a drug supplied by the Power Broker based on a lie that it was needed to stabilize his augmentation, but was used to keep him dependent on the Power Broker.

He has a heart condition, increasing his vulnerability to excessive exertion.

Dennis is a skilled aircraft pilot. He is also an excellent hand-to-hand combatant, especially in wrestling, and received further training from Captain America.

Other versions

Amazing Spider-Man: Renew Your Vows
During the "Secret Wars" storyline in the pages of Amazing Spider-Man: Renew Your Vows, a variation of Demolition Man is seen residing in the Battleworld domain of the Regency. He protests the rules of the Regent until he is beaten up by Boomerang, Rhino, and Shocker.

Earth-398
When Morgan le Fay usurps the Scarlet Witch's powers and remakes the world in Avengers (vol. 3), all of the Avengers members are remade into medieval versions possessing the same powers. In this reality, Demolition Man is renamed Serf and is a member of Morgan le Fay's elite guard called the Queen's Vengeance.

Reception

Newsarama ranked Demolition Man as the ninth worst Avengers member describing him as having "the power of pretty strong strength, constantly being confused for Wolverine and Daredevil, and as demonstrated in the first issue of Kurt Busiek and George Perez's Avengers run smelling so awful that no one wants to get within 30 feet of him."

References

External links
 Demolition Man at Marvel.com
 
 Bibliography page for The Official Handbook of the Marvel Universe containing Demolition Man
 Appendix to the Handbook of the Marvel Universe's article on Morgan Le Fay's alternate reality

Avengers (comics) characters
Comics characters introduced in 1985
Comics characters introduced in 1987
Fictional aviators
Fictional characters from Nebraska
Fictional characters with superhuman durability or invulnerability
Fictional gay males
Fictional professional wrestlers
Marvel Comics LGBT superheroes
Marvel Comics characters with superhuman strength
Marvel Comics martial artists
Marvel Comics mutates
Marvel Comics sidekicks